The Beaverhead River is an approximately  tributary of the Jefferson River in southwest Montana (east of the Continental Divide). The river's original headwaters, formed by the confluence of the Red Rock River and Horse Prairie Creek, are now flooded under Clark Canyon Reservoir, which also floods the first  of the river. The Beaverhead then flows through a broad valley northward to join the Big Hole River and form the Jefferson River.

The name of the Beaverhead originates from Beaverhead Rock on the middle river. This rock formation was recognized by Sacajawea when the Lewis and Clark Expedition passed the area in 1805. There were also many beavers in the area at the time, but the name does not originate from the animal. In 1805, Captain Meriwether Lewis traveled up the Jefferson and Beaverhead first, but when the rest of the expedition came, a sign Lewis had left at the confluence of the Beaverhead and Big Hole telling them to follow the Beaverhead had been cut down by a beaver, and the expedition traveled up the Big Hole instead. As a result, the swifter current of the Big Hole swamped two of their canoes before they could travel back down to the confluence.

Together with the Red Rock River, the Beaverhead forms the uppermost headwaters of the Missouri River, the longest tributary of the Mississippi River.

The river is a Class I water from the Clark Canyon Dam to its confluence with the Jefferson River for the purposes of public access for recreational purposes.

See also 

 Montana Stream Access Law
 List of rivers of Montana

References

Rivers of Montana
Rivers of Beaverhead County, Montana
Bodies of water of Madison County, Montana